VMOS is a virtual machine app that runs on Android, which can run another Android OS as the guest operating system.  Users can optionally run the guest Android VM as a rooted Android OS.  The VMOS guest Android operating system has access to the Google Play Store and other Google apps. VMOS was the first virtual machine for Android to support Google Play services and other Google apps.

Virtualization 
The app itself when downloaded is the base virtualization core, however, the Android operating system image for the guest OS is downloaded when the app is first opened up.  Being that the guest operating system is in a virtual environment, any configurations like a rooted android kernel on the guest, would not affect the host Android operating system or device.  Due to this, via VMOS allows running a rooted Android operating system on the phone via virtualization without the device actually being rooted, and thus no issues with warranty or with the cellular carrier/provider.  Being a virtual machine, the guest Android operating system has a separate disk image, and thus if a virus or other threat does something malicious in the guest operating system, it will not affect the host device and the host operating system.

Device requirements 
Due to being a virtual machine app, the app does have requirements that the device must meet in order to run the app.  One such requirement is that the phone must have at least more than 32GB storage.  The app also requires at least 2GB of RAM.  In order for the app to do virtualization and any optional user configured settings for the guest OS, the app requires multiple permissions.

Guest OS settings 
VMOS comes with many configuration settings for the guest OS other than the rooted Android operating system option.  Some of these options include choosing the display size resolution the guest would use, the ability to import/clone apps from the host operating system, allowing the use of phone calls, and many others.

Known uses 
Although VMOS can be used for anything the user wishes to do, there have been some notable uses that have been known.  Some major software developers suggest users to install VMOS to use their software on a device running the Android operating system.

One such known use is by app developers who create Android apps that are intended for rooted Android devices.  Another use was the ability for users to multitask or utilize an app with two instances of it, as many Android apps can only have a single instance.

Huawei Mate 30 
The Huawei Mate 30 was known to not be shipped with the official Google Play Store and related android system apps, due to Huawei being on the US blacklist. Huawei on the blacklist meant that it was not allowed to use any US hardware or software.  However, the unofficial Google Play App that was developed by a Chinese developer, enabled users of the device to download and install android apps.  However, the unofficial Google Play App was eventually removed.  However, many users have found ways to bring back the unofficial Google Play App, as well as port google apps to the device.  With one of these ported android apps being VMOS, many reviewers and critics of the device stated that VMOS was able to bring somewhat the Android operating system and the official Google Play apps to the device.

Huawei's next phone which is the Nova 5T, will eventually have actual Google apps and an actual Android operating system.

Reception 
The virtual machine app received a range of responses.  However, all gave a positive remark about the fact that it can virtualize an Android operating system.

Some of the positives that it received was that it could be used by developers to test Android apps that were intended for rooted devices, thus removing the hassle that developers faced with rooting their own devices to test their own apps.  Another positive that was given was that the app can not only just run in the background, but can also be run as a floating window.  Thus the guest OS and host could be used simultaneously.  One of the major pros was that if the app was ported to a non-Android device like Huawei Mate 30, the user would be able to use Google apps, Google Play Apps, as well as the Android operating system, via the ported VMOS app.  VMOS also makes it possible to have multiple accounts on apps.

Some of the negatives that were found were that with all virtualized operating systems regardless of the platform that the host is on, it would never reach the same speed as the host.  Another issue that was raised was the size that the app took on the phone.  Another negative that was stated was that online or on guest file system videos will display at a lower resolution and frame rate.

See also 

 OS virtualization and emulation on Android
 Virtual machine

References

External links 
Google Play Store link to app  -  

Official Website  -  

Android (operating system) software
Virtual machines

Alternative -